Round Valley may refer to:

Basins or valleys in the United States
 Round Valley (Pinto Mountain), a valley, in San Bernardino County, California
 Round Valley, a basin in Mendocino County, California; see 
 Round Valley (Millard County, Utah), a valley in Millard County and Sevier County, Utah; see Denmark Wash

Populated places
 Rural Municipality of Round Valley No. 410, Saskatchewan, Canada
 Round Valley, Arizona, a census-designated place in Gila County, Arizona
 Round Valley, California, a census-designated place in Inyo County, California
 Round Valley, Plumas County, California, a former settlement in Plumas County, California
 Round Valley, Nebraska, an unincorporated community in Custer County, Nebraska

Other uses
 Round Valley Indian Tribes of the Round Valley Reservation, in Mendocino County, California
 Round Valley Reservoir, in Hunterdon County, New Jersey
 Round Valley Unified School District, in Apache County, Arizona